This is a list of African-American Cemeteries in New York.

Individual cemeteries

References

Cemeteries
 
Cemeteries in New York (state)
New York (state)-related lists
Cemeteries in New York
New York
African-American history of New York (state)